The special ranks in the Investigative Committee of Russia are defined by the article 20 of the Federal Law of 28 December 2010 No.403-FZ.

Shoulder marks are used as insignia.

Ranks and insignia

See also
 Prosecutor's ranks in Russian Federation
 State civilian and municipal service ranks in Russian Federation
 Diplomatic ranks in Russian Federation
 Army ranks and insignia of the Russian Federation
 Naval ranks and insignia of the Russian Federation

References

Law enforcement service ranks in the Russian Federation